The Electoral district of Pastoral District of Maneroo was an electorate of the New South Wales Legislative Council at a time when some of its members were elected and the balance were appointed by the Governor. It was a new electorate created in 1851 by the expansion of the Legislative Council to 54, 18 to be appointed and 36 elected. The district covered the Maneroo region now known as Monaro in the south east of New South Wales. To its north was the Electoral district of Counties of Murray and St Vincent. Polling was to occur in the towns of Goulburn, Eden, Cooma and Bombala.

In 1856 the unicameral Legislative Council was abolished and replaced with an elected Legislative Assembly and an appointed Legislative Council. The district was represented by the Legislative Assembly electorate of Maneroo.

Members

Election results

1851

1854
Arthur Jeffreys resigned in February 1854.

References

Former electoral districts of New South Wales Legislative Council
1851 establishments in Australia
1856 disestablishments in Australia